Ionikos Nikaias B.C. (Greek: Iωνικός Νίκαιας K.A.E.) is a Greek professional basketball club that is located in Nikaia, Piraeus, Athens. The club was founded in 1965. It is a part of the A.O. Ionikos Nikaias (Α.Ο. Ιωνικός Νίκαιας) multi-sports club. The team's colors are white and blue. The team currently plays in the Greek Basket League, the first tier level in Greek basketball.

Logos

History

Early years
Ionikos Nikaias' men's basketball club was founded in 1965, and it played its first game in 1966, during the 1966–67 season. Over the years, the club has featured Greek players such as: Panagiotis Giannakis, Fotis Katsikaris, Nikos Oikonomou, Vangelis Margaritis, Vassilis Kavvadas, and Marios Batis. Ionikos Nikaias played in the Greek 2nd Division for the first time, in the 1972–73 season. The club won the Greek 2nd Division first group in the 1974–75 season, and was thus promoted to the top-tier level Greek League, for the first time, for the 1975–76 season.

The club made 12 consecutive season appearances in the top-tier level Greek Basket League, during the 1970s and 1980s period, from the 1975–76 season, to the 1986–87 season. The club also competed in the 3rd-tier level European-wide competition, the FIBA Korać Cup, in both the 1979–80 and 1984–85 seasons.

On January 24, 1981, Ionikos Nikaias, led by a then 22-year-old Giannakis, played against Aris Thessaloniki, which was led at the time by Nikos Galis. Aris won in a tight game, by a score of 114–113. The game is memorable in the history of Greek pro club basketball, because in the game, Giannakis scored 73 points, and Galis scored 62 points, achieving the 2nd and 4th most points scored in a single game of the Greek League basketball championship.

On August 3, 1984, Ionikos Nikaias transferred its club star Panagiotis Giannakis, to the Greek club Aris Thessaloniki. Aris paid Ionikos Nikaias a transfer fee for his player rights, in the amount of 42 million Greek Drachmas, which was considered a huge amount of money for a transfer at that time. In order to complete the transfer, Giannakis also personally received a BMW car, a sporting goods store, and 8 million drachmas from Aris.

Recent years
Ionikos Nikaias won the Greek 3rd Division south conference in the 2017–18 season, and thus earned a league promotion to the Greek 2nd Division, for the 2018–19 season. That marked the first time the club had played in the Greek 2nd Division, since the 2003–04 season. In the 2018–19 season, Ionikos won the Greek 2nd Division (A2) championship, and was promoted up to the first tier level Greek Basket League, for the 2019–20 season. That marked the first time the club had played in Greece's first division, since the 1986–87 season.

Ionikos Nikaias B.C. in international competitions

Arenas
Ionikos' long-time home arena (1970–2018, 2020–present) is the Nikaias Platonas Indoor Hall (Greek: Κλειστό Γυμναστήριο Πλάτων Νικαίας), which is an indoor arena that is located in Nikaia, Piraeus, Athens, and has a seating capacity of 1,200 people. Platonas Gymnasium was renovated in 2020. For the Greek Basket League 2019–20 season, while the arena was being renovated, Ionikos moved into the Sofia Befon Indoor Hall, which is located in Palaio Faliro, Piraeus, Athens, and has a seating capacity of 1,204 people.

Honors and titles

Domestic competitions
Greek 2nd Division (B) / Greek 2nd Division (A2) Champion: (2)
(1974–75 B), 2018–19 A2)
Greek 3rd Division Champion: (1)
(2017–18)

European competitions
Participant in FIBA Korać Cup (3rd-tier): (2) 
(1979–80, 1984–85)

Roster

Depth chart

Notable players

Greece:
 Nikos Arsenopoulos
 Giannis Athinaiou
 Marios Batis
 Dimitris Bogdanos
 Vassilis Charalampopoulos
 Nikos Chougkaz
 Ioannis Dimakos
 Panagiotis Giannakis
 Costis Gontikas
 Georgios Kalafatakis
 Andreas Kanonidis
 Vangelis Karampoulas
 Fotis Katsikaris
 Sotiris Katoufas
 Vassilis Kavvadas
 Iosif Koloveros
 Dimitris Kompodietas
 Thomas Kottas  
 Nikos Liakopoulos   
 Dimitris Lolas   
 Vangelis Mantzaris
 Vangelis Margaritis
 Loukas Mavrokefalidis
 Iakovos Milentigievits 
 Nikos Oikonomou
 Andreas Papadopoulos
 Michael Paragyios
 Christos Petrodimopoulos
 Andreas Petropoulos
 Ioannis Sachpatzidis
 Vangelis Sakellariou
 Sofoklis Schortsanitis
 Vassilis Toliopoulos
 Fotis Vasilopoulos

Europe:
/ Angelo Tsagarakis     
 Roeland Schaftenaar 
 Muhaymin Mustafa 

United States: 
/ Steve Burtt Jr.
 Jordan Callahan
 Toarlyn Fitzpatrick
 Eugene German
 Daniel Hamilton
 Jeremy Hollowell
 Jamal Jones
 Lucky Jones
 Eugene Lawrence
 Josh Owens
 Terell Parks
 Sayeed Pridgett
 Adam Smith
 B. J. Stith
 Nick Zeisloft

Head coaches

Season by season
Scroll down to see more.

See also
A.O. Ionikos Nikaias (multi-sport club)
Ionikos Nikaias F.C. (football club)

References

External links
 Official website 
 Ionikos Nikaias B.C. Twitter 
 Ionikos Nikaias B.C. Facebook 
 Ionikos Nikaias B.C. YouTube
 Eurobasket.com Team Profile

 
Ionikos Nikaias
Basketball teams established in 1965
Basketball teams in Greece
Nikaia-Agios Ioannis Rentis